The Biddle family of Philadelphia, Pennsylvania is an Old Philadelphian family descended from English immigrants William Biddle (1630–1712) and Sarah Kempe (1634–1709), who arrived in the Province of New Jersey in 1681. Quakers, they had emigrated from England in part to escape religious persecution.

William Biddle, 3rd (1698–1756), and John Biddle (1707–1789), two third-generation brothers, moved from Mount Hope (1684) near Bordentown, also on the east side of the Delaware, to Philadelphia, Pennsylvania in the 1720s and 1730s. They constituted the first generation of the Philadelphia Biddle family, which became involved in the business, political and cultural life of Pennsylvania and the United States.

Family members

Branch of William Biddle, 3rd (1698–1756) and Mary Scull (1709–1789)

 William Biddle, 3rd (1698–1756) and Mary Scull (1709–1790)
 James Biddle (1731–1797), prothonotary of Philadelphia courts, married Frances Marks
 Marks John Biddle (1765–1849), married Jane Dundas
 Lydia Biddle (1734–1767), married William McFunn (?–1768), captain in the Royal Navy and Governor of the Island of Antigua, West Indies
 William McFunn Biddle (1764–1809), married Lydia Spencer (1766–1858), daughter of Elihu Spencer, niece of John Berrien and sister-in-law of Jonathan Dickinson Sergeant 
 Lydia Spencer Biddle (1797–1871), married Samuel Baird (1786–1833)
 Spencer Fullerton Baird (1823–1887), first U.S. Commissioner of Fish and Fisheries and second secretary of the Smithsonian Institution, married Mary Helen Churchill (1846–?)
 Mary Deborah Baird (1829–1900), endowed Biddle University, married distant cousin Henry Jonathan Biddle (1817–1862) who was a grandson of Clement Biddle
 Valeria Fullerton Biddle, married Charles Bingham Penrose (1798–1857), Speaker of the Pennsylvania Senate, Solicitor of the United States Treasury, and Assistant Secretary of the Treasury
 William McFunn Biddle, Jr., married Julian Montgomery
 Mary Elizabeth Dagworthy Biddle (1805–1879), married Maj. George Blaney (1795–1835), captain with the U.S. Army Corps of Engineers
 Edward Biddle, married Julia H. Watts
 David W. Biddle
 Lydia Spencer Biddle,
 Charles Penrose Biddle
 Frederick W. Biddle
 Edward William Biddle (1852–1931), married Gertrude Dale Bosler
 Herman Bosler Biddle (1883–1909)
 Edward McFunn Biddle (1886–?)
 William McFunn Biddle
 John "Jacky" Biddle (1736–?) married Sophia Boone
 Edward Biddle, bought Biddle House on Mackinac Island
 William Biddle married Abigail Johnson
 Joseph Cadwalader Biddle (1805–1884) married Elizabeth Cook (died 1899)
 William Biddle married Anna W.?
 Frederick Davis Biddle married Estelle Warne Harbeson
 Eric Harbeson Biddle (1898–1993), businessman and diplomat, assisted Franklin D. Roosevelt during the creation of the United Nations and the United Nations Establishment Commissions  (married Katherine Rogers, the daughter of Colonel John I. Rogers).
 Eric Harbeson Biddle Jr. (1928–2012), CIA Section Chief, later immigration lawyer
 John "Jack" Biddle 
 Maurice R. Biddle (1932–1999), jazz composer and pianist, also advertising executive in Philadelphia and New York City
 Edward Biddle (1738–1779), lawyer, soldier, delegate to the Continental Congress, married Elizabeth Ross (sister of George Ross)
 Charles Biddle (1745–1821), politician and Vice President of the Supreme Council of the Commonwealth of Pennsylvania, married Hannah Shepard
 James Biddle (1783–1848), US Navy Commodore
 Nicholas Biddle (1786–1844), president of the Second Bank of the United States, married Jane Craig
 Edward Biddle (1815–1873), married Jane Josephine Sarmiento
 Edward Biddle III (1851–1933), married Emilie Taylor Drexel (1851–1883) daughter of Anthony Joseph Drexel
 Anthony Joseph Drexel Biddle, Sr. (1874–1948), subject of novel (written by his daughter), which was  adapted as the Broadway play and Disney motion picture The Happiest Millionaire
 Anthony Joseph Drexel Biddle Jr. (1897–1961), U.S. ambassador to seven different countries, married Mary Duke (1887–1960), the sister of Angier Buchanan Duke
 Mary Duke Biddle (1920–2012), heiress and philanthropist
 Nicholas Duke Biddle (1921–2004)
 Cordelia Drexel Biddle (1898–1984), married Angier Buchanan Duke (1884–1923), the brother of Mary Duke
 Angier Biddle Duke (1915–1995), U.S. Ambassador to El Salvador 1952–1953, U.S. Ambassador to Spain 1965–1968, U.S. Ambassador to Morocco 1979–1981, member of the Council on Foreign Relations
 Anthony Drexel Duke (1918–2014)
 Livingston Ludlow Biddle (1899–1981) married Kate Raboteau Page (1903–?), daughter of Robert N. Page
 Livingston Ludlow Biddle (1926–2009) married  Elizabeth "Betsy" Elwell Collin in 1953 
 Livingston Ludlow Biddle (1877–1959), married Rosalie Eugenia Carter Law (1890–1980)
 Livingston Ludlow Biddle Jr. (1918–2002), chairman National Endowment for the Arts
 Ernest Law Biddle (1919–1970)
 Edward Craig Biddle (1879–1947), tennis player, married firstly Laura Baker Whelen (1879–1925)
 Craig Biddle Jr. (1902–1988)
 George Drexel Biddle (1903–1952)
 Laura May Biddle Stewart 
 Charles John Biddle (1819–1873), Civil War colonel and U.S. Congressman, married Emma Mather (1830–1918)
 Charles Biddle (1857–1923) married Letitia Glenn
 Charles John Biddle (1890–1972), World War I aviator and lawyer
 Alexander Mercer Biddle (1865–?), married Marriet Fox (1867–?)
 Sydney Biddle (1901–?), married Donald Byers Barrows (1898–1991) 
 Donald Byers Barrows Jr. (1926–2019), married Jeannette Ballantine (1930–2011)
 Sydney Biddle Barrows (born January 14, 1952), New York City madam and author, known as the "Mayflower Madam" 
 Thomas Biddle (1790–1831), War of 1812 hero who died after a duel with a Missouri Congressman over a perceived insult to his brother Nicholas
 John Biddle (1792–1859), Michigan politician, married Eliza Falconer Bradish 
 Magaretta Falconer Biddle (1825–1913), married General Andrew Porter (1820–1872)
 William Shepard Biddle (1830–1901), married Susan Dayton Ogden
 John Biddle (1859–1936), Superintendent of the United States Military Academy
 William Shepard Biddle II (1863–1938), married Margaret Alden Burrell
 William Shepard Biddle III (1900–1981), Major General in World War II
 Richard Biddle (1796–1847), U.S. Representative
 Nicholas Biddle (1750–1778), Revolutionary War Navy captain

Branch of John Biddle (1707–1789) and Sarah Owen (1711–1773)

John Biddle (1707–1789) and Sarah Owen (1711–1773)
 Owen Biddle, Sr.  (1737–1799), American Revolutionary War soldier, mathematician, astronomer, observed 1769 transit of Venus at Cape Henlopen, member of the American Philosophical Society, married Sarah Parke  
 John Biddle (1763–1815) 
 William Biddle (1806–1887), married Elizabeth Garrett (1806–1881)
 Samuel Biddle (1844–1919), Bailey Banks & Biddle jewelry store
 Owen Biddle Jr. (1774–1806), member of the Carpenters' Company of the City and County of Philadelphia, architect-builder, author "The Young Carpenters' Apprentice" (1805)
 Clement Biddle (1778–1856), married Mary Canby (1780–1849)
 Robert M. Biddle (1814–1902), married Anna Miller (1823–1891)
 Henry Canby Biddle (1845–1886), married Anna Mary McIlvain (1850–1926)
 Robert Ralston Biddle (1885–?), lent name to Biddle Motor Car Company
 Clement Biddle (1740–1814), American Revolutionary War soldier, helped organize the "Quaker Blues" volunteers, deputy quartermaster general of the Pennsylvania and New Jersey militia, married Rebekah Cornell (born 1755) daughter of Gideon Cornell
 Francis Biddle (1775–1775)
 Thomas Alexander Biddle, Sr. (1776–1857), married Christine Williams (1780–1861)
 Clement Biddle (1810–1879), prominent Philadelphia lawyer, served during the Civil War in Landis' Battery, Pennsylvania Militia Light Artillery.
 Thomas Alexander Biddle Jr. (1814–1888), married Julia Cox (1819–1906). He was the senior partner of the firm of Thomas A. Biddle & Co., bankers and brokers, and a director of the Cumberland Valley Railroad Company, the Allentown Iron Company, the Equitable Life Insurance Company, and other corporations.
 Henry Jonathan Biddle (1817–1862), married distant cousin Mary Deborah Baird (1829–1900), who endowed Biddle University. He served as a captain in the Union Army during the Civil War; he was mortally wounded during the battle of New Market Cross Roads
 Jonathan Williams Biddle (1855–1877), served during the War with the Plains Indians. He was killed at Bear Paw Mountain, Montana when his regiment charged a camp of Nez Perce Indians.
 Henry Jonathan Biddle (1862–1928), Oregon/Washington engineer, businessman, and philanthropist.  In 1915 he bought the Columbia Gorge landmark Beacon Rock and developed a trail to its peak; his children Spencer and Rebecca donated it to Washington as a state park.
 Alexander Williams Biddle Sr. (1819–1899), lieutenant colonel in the Union Army during the American Civil War, married Julia Williams Rush (1833–1898) granddaughter of Benjamin Rush
 Alexander Williams Biddle Jr. (1856–1916), married Anne McKennan (1858–1934)
 Julia Rush Biddle (1886–1978), married Thomas Charlton Henry (1887–1930), mother-in-law of Philip D. Armour Jr.
 Alexander Biddle (1893–1973), married Margot Scull (1896–1972)
 Henry Rush Biddle (1858–1877)
 Julia Rush Biddle (1859–1885)
 James Wilmer Biddle (1861–1927), married Cora Rowland (1861–1927)
 Mariamne Biddle (1866–1917)
 Lynford Biddle (1871–1941)
 Jonathan Williams Biddle (1821–1856), married Emily Skinner Meigs (1824–1905)
 Christine Biddle (1847–1900), married Richard McCall Cadwalader (1839–1918)
 Charles Meigs Biddle (1849–1853)
 Williams Biddle (1850–1852)
 Mary Biddle (1851–1851)
 Thomas Biddle (1853–1915)
 Emily Williams Biddle (1855–1931)
 George Washington Biddle (1779–1811)
  Mary Biddle (1781–1850) married Thomas Cadwalader (1779–1841) son of General John Cadwalader
 Rebekah Cornell Biddle (1782–1870), married Nathaniel Chapman (1780–1853)
 Clement Cornell Biddle (1784–1855), married Mary Searle Barclay (1785–1872)
 John Barclay Biddle (1815–1879), married Caroline Phillips (1821–1906)
 William Phillips Biddle (1853–1923), 11th Commandant of the U.S. Marine Corps (1910–1914)
 George Washington Biddle (1818–1897), married Maria Coxe McMurtrie (1818–1901)
 George Washington Biddle Jr. (1843–1886), married Mary Hosack Rogers
 Algernon Sydney Biddle (1847–1891) married Frances Robinson
 Moncure Biddle (1882–1956), a banker
 George Biddle (1885–1973), an artist
 Francis Beverly Biddle (1886–1968), US Attorney General, and primary American judge during the Nuremberg trials
 Sydney Geoffrey Biddle (1889–1954), a psychologist
 Oliver Cadwell Biddle, married to Katharine Mortimer (1923–2003)
 Christine Mortimer Biddle, married to Thomas George Reeves in 1972.
 Arthur Biddle (1852–1897)
 Chapman Biddle (1822–1880), Civil War colonel
 Anne Biddle (1785–1786)
 Lydia H. Biddle (1787–1826)
 Sarah T. Biddle (1789–1790)
 Anne Wilkinson Biddle (1791–?), married Thomas Dunlap (1793–1864)
 John Gideon Biddle (1793–1826), married his cousin Mary Biddle (?–1854)
 James Cornell Biddle (1795–1838), married Sarah Caldwell Keppele (1789–1877) daughter of Michael Keppele (1771–1821)
 Thomas Biddle (diplomat) (1827–1875), married Sarah Frederica White (1845–1870)
 Caldwell Keppele Biddle (1829–1862)
 Catherine Keppele Biddle (1831–1914), married William P. Tatham (1820–1899)
 Rebecca Biddle (1833–1859)
 James Cornell Biddle (1835–1898), married Gertrude Gouverneur Meredith (1839–1905). He served as an officer in the Union Army during the Civil War.
 Cadwalader Biddle (1837–1906), founder of Union League of Philadelphia
 Ann Biddle (1742–1807), married James Wilkinson (1757–1825)
 John Wilkinson (1780–1796)
 James Biddle Wilkinson (c. 1783–1813)
 Joseph Biddle Wilkinson (1789–1865), married to Catherine Andrews (1785–1861)
 Joseph Biddle Wilkinson Jr. (1817–1902), married to Josephine Osborne Stark (1823–1908)
 Joseph Biddle Wilkinson III (1845–1915), married to Lydia Duval (d. 1937)
 Theodore Stark Wilkinson (1847–1921), a U.S. Representative from Louisiana.
 Theodore Stark Wilkinson (1888–1946), a Vice-Admiral of the United States Navy during World War II
 Walter Wilkinson (1791–1837), married to Emilia Louise Valle (1793–1849)

See also
 Biddle House (Mackinac Island)
 List of United States political families

References
 The Washington Post; August 17, 1933 "Helen Avis Howard Engaged To Anthony J. Drexel, Jr. Dr. and Mrs. Clinton Howard, of Atlanta, have announced the engagement of their daughter. Miss Helen Avis Howard, to Mr. Anthony Joseph Drexel 3d, son of Mr. and Mrs. Anthony Joseph Drexel, jr., of Philadelphia."
 The New York Times; October 14, 2004 "Nicholas Duke Biddle, 83, Scion Of Wealth Who Helped the Poor. Nicholas Duke Biddle, scion of two prominent American families who helped refugees from Cuba and Caribbean, dies at age 83.  Mr. Biddle was originally named Anthony Joseph Drexel Biddle III, after his father, Anthony Joseph Drexel Biddle Jr., a prominent diplomat."

Citations

External links
 The Biddle Family Papers, documenting the personal, professional and social life of members of the Biddle family from 1683–1954, are available for research use at the Historical Society of Pennsylvania.
 William & Sarah Biddle's MOUNT HOPE, West Jersey (1684-2007/8) 
 Nicholas & Sarah Biddle's MELMAR, Pennsylvania  (1910-) 

 
American families of English ancestry